Parton may refer to:

People
David Parton, English singer-songwriter and record producer
Dick Parton (died 2006), Australian rules footballer
Dolly Parton (born 1946), American country singer, songwriter, composer, author, and actress
James Parton (1822–1891), American biographer
Jeff Parton (born 1953), Welsh football goalkeeper
Jim Parton, fathers' rights activist
John Parton (1863–1906), English cricketer
Lucy Rose Parton (born 1989), English singer-songwriter
Mabel Parton (1881–1962), British tennis player
Mark Parton (born 1966), Australian politician
Randy Parton (born 1953), American country singer and business person
Sarah Jane Parton (born 1980), New Zealand new media artist
Samantha (Sam) Parton, musician with The Be Good Tanyas
Stella Parton (born 1949), American country singer
Tim Parton, American pianist
Tom Parton, English Rugby player
Tony Parton (born 1967), English cricketer
V. R. Parton (1897–1974), English chess player

Places
Parton, Cumbria, England
Parton, Dumfries and Galloway, Scotland
Parton, Herefordshire, England

Railway stations
Parton railway station, in Cumbria, England
Parton Halt railway station, also in Cumbria, near to but different from, Parton railway station
Parton (P&WJR) railway station, in Dumfries and Galloway, Scotland

Other uses
Parton (particle physics), is the name for a particle